Katherine (Katey) Bates (born 18 May 1982 in Sydney) is a former Australian track and road cyclist. A multiple national champion, Bates rode as a professional since 2002. Katey's career highlights included Australian Road Race Champion in 2006, World Points Race Champion in 2007 and Commonwealth Games champion in 2002 and 2006.

Bates competed in both track and road at the Olympic Games, finishing fourth in the individual pursuit at the 2004 Summer Olympics and sixth in the points race at the 2008 Summer Olympics. Bates retired in December 2011 due to injury.

Her sister, Natalie Bates, was also a professional racing cyclist.

She now co-runs Chicks Who Rides Bikes, a women's cycling organisation which supports women at all levels of cycling as well as working as a freelance television commentator and host. She has covered World Championships, Olympic Games, Tour De France and other National and World Tour cycling events for Network 7 and SBS Australia, where she hosts Tour de France preview show, Bonjour Le Tour.

Her spouse, Luke Miers, is a Walkley Award-winning camera-operator.

Palmarès

2000
2nd World Time Trial Championships, Plouay – Junior

2001
2nd Points Race, World Track Championships, Antwerp
3rd Amstel Gold Race Netherlands

2002
3rd Individual Pursuit, World Track Championships, Copenhagen
1st Points Race, Commonwealth Games, Manchester
2nd Individual Pursuit, Commonwealth Games, Manchester

2003
1st Individual Pursuit, World Cup, Moscow
1st Overall, Geelong Tour, Australia
2nd Australian Criterium Championships, Victoria

2004
4th Individual Pursuit, 2004 Summer Olympics
1st Stage 2, Vuelta a Castilla y León, Zamora
1st Individual Pursuit, World Cup, Manchester
1st Points Race, World Cup, Manchester
2nd Stage 2, Geelong Tour, Australia
3rd Overall, Geelong Tour, Australia

2005
1st Points Race, World Cup, Manchester
1st Individual Pursuit, World Cup, Manchester
1st Scratch Race, World Cup, Manchester
1st  Individual Pursuit, Australian National Track Championships, Adelaide
1st  Points Race, Australian National Track Championships, Adelaide
1st  Scratch Race, Australian National Track Championships, Adelaide
2nd Individual Pursuit, World Track Championships, Los Angeles
2nd Scratch Race, World Track Championships, Los Angeles
3rd Points Race, World Track Championships, Los Angeles

2006 (Equipe Nürnberger Versicherung)
1st  Australian National Road Race Championships, Mount Torrens
1st  Scratch Race, Australian National Track Championships, Adelaide
1st  Points Race, Australian National Track Championships, Adelaide
2nd Individual Pursuit, Australian National Track Championships, Adelaide
1st Points Race, Commonwealth Games, Melbourne – defeated teammate Rochelle Gilmore
2nd Individual Pursuit, Commonwealth Games, Melbourne
1st Stage 3, Le Tour du Grand Montréal, Canada
1st Stage 4, Euregio Ladies Tour, Bilzen
1st Stage 5, Bay Classic, Docklands
1st Points Race, World Cup, Sydney
1st Stage 1, Tri-Peaks Challenge USA
1st Individual Pursuit Track World Cup, United Kingdom
2nd Scratch Race Track World Cup, United Kingdom
3rd Women's Road World Cup Geelong, Australia

2007
1st Stage 1, 1st Stage 5 & 1st Final GC Bay Classic
1st Points Race, World Track Championships, Palma de Mallorca
3rd Points Race, Track World Cup, Beijing
3rd Overall, Le Tour du Grand Montréal, Canada
3rd Stage 1, International Thüringen Rundfahrt, Germany
3rd Australian Criterium Championship, Queensland

2008
6th Points race, 2008 Summer Olympics

2009 INJURED - (Team Columbia-HTC 2009 season)

2010
1st Scratch Race, Oceania Track Cycling Championships, Adelaide
1st Women's Team Pursuit, Oceania Track Cycling Championships, Adelaide
1st Women's Team Pursuit, Track World Cup, Melbourne

2011
2nd Women's scratch, 2011 UCI Track Cycling World Championships, Apeldoorn

References

External links

Katherine Bates at Cycling Australia

Gritty Bates pursues Games berth, The Age, 3 December 2010
Kate Bates to make cycling comeback, Sydney Morning Herald, 23 November 2010
Women's Team Pursuit, 2010–2011 UCI Track Cycling World Cup Classics, Melbourne
ABC News 23 Feature, 3 December 2010

1982 births
Living people
Australian female cyclists
Olympic cyclists of Australia
Cyclists at the 2004 Summer Olympics
Cyclists at the 2008 Summer Olympics
Commonwealth Games gold medallists for Australia
Commonwealth Games silver medallists for Australia
Cyclists at the 2002 Commonwealth Games
Cyclists at the 2006 Commonwealth Games
UCI Track Cycling World Champions (women)
Sportswomen from New South Wales
Australian Institute of Sport cyclists
Cyclists from Sydney
Commonwealth Games medallists in cycling
Australian track cyclists
People educated at Oakhill College
20th-century Australian women
21st-century Australian women
Medallists at the 2002 Commonwealth Games
Medallists at the 2006 Commonwealth Games